Lebanese singer Nancy Ajram has released 8 video albums and more than 40 music videos, appeared in numerous television programs and 24 television commercials. In 1997, Ajram released her debut music for the single "Oulha Kelma", produced by Future TV. One year later, she signed a recording contract with EMI and released her second music video "Mihtagalak", taken from her debut studio album Mihtagalak (1998), directed by Lebanese director Elie Feghali. Like the debut album, only one music video was directed for her second album, Sheel Oyoonak Anni. Ajram generated much attention in 2003 following the release of the music video for "Akhasmak Ah", her third studio album Ya Salam'''s lead single, which was found controversial owing to the depiction of overtly sexual activities. However, she later received praise in mid-2003 for the visual for the album's second single and title track "Ya Salam", which received a Murex d'Or Award for its positive portrayal of a star with a sad life inspired from the 1960s. The video was directed by Nadine Labaki as a second collaboration with Ajram.

In 2004, Ajram released her fourth studio album Ah W Noss; four music videos for the singles "Ah W Noss", "Lawn Ouyounak", "Oul Tani Keda" and "Inta Eyh" from the album were shot. The lead single's video was directed by Nadine Labaki and was highlighted for portraying an Egyptian villager. The music video for "Oul Tani Keda", which was served as Coca-Cola campaign single, was filmed with the international Italian director Luca Tomassini, it was made of footage of backstage scenes from the commercial. Ajram's 2006 studio album Ya Tabtab...Wa Dallaa was promoted by six music videos, and her 2007 studio album for children Shakhbat Shakhabit received its promotion from the medley video which features four different tracks, directed by Said El Marouk.

In 2008, Ajram released her sixth studio album Betfakkar Fi Eih, which spawned five music videos. The release of Ajram's seven album Nancy 7 (2010) was preceded by the music videos for its singles "Fi Hagat", "Sheikh El Shabab", which garnered her three awards, and "Ya Kether", which features Syrian actor Kosai Khauli as Ajram's lover. In 2012, Ajram released her second studio album for children Super Nancy, accompanied by a medley music video of same name, her daughters Mila and Ella were featured in the video. In 2014, Nancy 8's lead single video "Ma Tegi Hena" met with criticism and controversy for its sexual imagery, many critics compared it to her breakthrough hit, "Akhasmak Ah". However, Nancy 8 spawned another four music videos.

In addition to her music videos, Ajram has released eight video albums. two DVDs Live at the Jerash Festival 2004 and Ma La Ta'arifunahu An Nancy Ajram were filmed in accompaniment with Ajram's concert in Jordan (2004) and concert tour in USA (2005). Meanwhile the other video albums The Best of Nancy Clips (2008) and Video Clips 2 (2010) were released in the Middle East featuring live performances and music videos. She has additionally appeared in several television shows, including the reality television series Arab Idol, of which three out of four seasons saw her contribution as a judge, and The Voice Kids'', where she served as a coach.

Music videos

Other videos

Video albums

Live video albums

Documentary video albums

Music video albums

Commercials

Video awards and nominations

References 

Videographies of Lebanese artists